Carl Gray may refer to:

 Carl Raymond Gray (1867–1939), American railroad executive
 Carl R. Gray Jr. (1889–1955), United States Army general